The first cabinet of Jóannes Eidesgaard was the government of the Faroe Islands from  3 February 2004 until 4 February 2008. It was a coalition between People's Party (Fólkaflokkurin), Union Party (Sambandsflokkurin) and the Social Democratic Party (Javnaðarflokkurin) with Jóannes Eidesgaard as Prime Minister. The letters for these political parties are A, B and C and therefore this cabinet was called the ABC cabinet or the ABC coalition (ABC landsstýrið or ABC samgongan).

References 

Cabinets of the Faroe Islands
2004 in the Faroe Islands
2005 in the Faroe Islands
2006 in the Faroe Islands
2007 in the Faroe Islands
2008 in the Faroe Islands